Luke Jerram (born 1974) is a British installation artist. He creates sculptures, large installations, and live arts projects.

He is currently a visiting fellow at the Faculty of Health and Applied Sciences, University of the West of England, Bristol. Jerram is colour blind.

Selected works 

 Museum of the Moon
 Aeolus
 Dream Director
 Play Me, I'm Yours
 Glass Microbiology
 Park and Slide
 Sky Orchestra
 Tide
 Maya
 Withdrawn (2015)
 Gaia is a 7 metre diameter sculpture of Earth, an installation at St Paul’s Cathedral Melbourne in 2022

Selected awards 

 Fellowship at Museum of Glass, Washington. 2011
 ACE Grants for the Arts Programme, Touring of Aeolus 2010
 25th Rakow Award from  The Corning Museum of Glass] 2010
  EPSRC, PPE Grant with ISVR, Southampton University 2009
 ACE Grants for the Arts Programme, Touring of the Dream Director 2008
 UK Clark Digital Arts Bursary, Watershed 2006
 AHRC Arts and Science Fellowship at UWE 2005-2006
 NESTA (National Endowment for Science Technology and Arts) Fellowship 2002-2005
 ACE Arts Council Touring Grant for Tide 2001
 Da2 Digital Arts Development Agency  1999

Residencies 

 Pervasive Media Studio, Bristol 2009
 FACT, Liverpool for European Capital of Culture, 2008
 Sodanklya Geophysical Observatory Lapland, 2003
 Watershed Media Arts Centre, 2003
 RIXC, Riga, Latvia, 2003
 St.Lawrence University, New York, 2002

References

 Exhibitionism - The Art of Display. 
 Irish Arts Review Oct 2009
 Science Magazine Vol 326, Issue 5951 
 Medicine and Art. Mori Art Museum.  
 Live Variola Virus. Book by AM Arvin, DM Patel, 2009 
 Art in Mind, Book by Jerram published by the Watershed, Bristol, 2008. 
 Bath Royal and Literary & Scientific Institution Vol10  
 The New Astronomy: Opening the Electromagnetic Window and Expanding Our View of Planet Earth. 2006  
 Acoustic Space 6 Waves, RIXC. Aug 2006, 
 Dreams - Scientific Journal Nov 2006
 OLATS, April 2004
 Acoustic Space Art: Media Architecture, May 2002,

External links 
  Luke Jerram

1974 births
Living people
Artists from Bristol
Recipients of the Rakow Commission